Jalizav (also Romanized as Jālīzāv; also known as Jālīzāb) is a village in Darreh Kayad Rural District, Sardasht District, Dezful County, Khuzestan Province, Iran. At the 2006 census, its population was 27, in 6 families.

References 

Populated places in Dezful County